Cold River Bridge may refer to:

Cold River Bridge (Langdon, New Hampshire), listed on the National Register of Historic Places in Sullivan County, New Hampshire
Cold River Bridge (Clarendon, Vermont), listed on the National Register of Historic Places in Rutland County, Vermont